Lymania globosa is a plant species in the genus Lymania. This species is endemic to Brazil.

References

globosa
Flora of Brazil